Picigin is traditional ball game from Split, Croatia that is played on the beach. It is an amateur sport played in shallow water consisting of players keeping a small ball from touching the water.

Origin

Picigin originated on the sandy beach of Bačvice in Split. It was first played in 1908 by a group of Croatian students returning from Prague who were finding it difficult to play the game of water polo in the shallow water. Instead, they began playing a different game which would come to be known as picigin.

Description
The game involves several players in a circle batting around a small ball with their hands; the objective is to keep the ball in the air and out of the water for as long as possible. Players don't catch the ball, they bounce it around with the palm of the hand. As such, the game somewhat resembles net-less volleyball, but is played with a much smaller ball, usually a peeled tennis ball. There is no set number of players, though five is usually average. Much running and diving is done in order to keep the ball from going in the shallow water. Picigin is considered a non-competitive sport: there are no opposing sides, no points, neither winners nor losers. It is generally viewed as a relaxing and fun game, and many take the opportunity to make extravagant leaps and acrobatic manoeuvrings to keep the ball in play.

Rules
Since picigin is an amateur sport, there are no strict or formal rules, but it is played according to tradition, with little variation, but the main goal is to keep ball in the air as long as possible.

Players
There are usually five players in the game. Two of them are called sidruni (sidro = anchor, they are called so because they do not move from their places) and the other three are runners (trkači). The groups are often mixed both by gender and age.

Terrain
Picigin must be played on a sandy beach in shallow water. The beach must be sandy because otherwise players could easily get hurt. It is best if the water is ankle-deep, because of mobility and also to soften falls, which are common because there's a lot of jumping around trying to reach the ball.

Ball
The traditional ball, called balun (otherwise a dialectal name for a ball, but this name is strictly used, especially by expert players) is actually a peeled tennis ball, polished off a few millimeters. This kind of ball is best suited for bouncing. It is smooth and lighter than a normal tennis ball.

Tradition
The most traditional players believe it to be impossible to play picigin anywhere but on the sandy beach of Bačvice in Split, which is considered the game's spiritual home. 

Picigin is played on Bačvice year round and, often at night in the summer (reflectors can be used in the dark). There is also a longstanding tradition of playing picigin on New Year's Day regardless of weather conditions, when the sea temperature is rarely above 15 °C.

In June 2008, picigin was pronounced a Croatian immaterial cultural good, for a period of three years, with pending plans for a permanent designation.

Championships
Since 2005, the Picigin World Championship in picigin (Prvenstvo svita u piciginu) is organized every year on Bačvice beach in Split. Until 2008, players were given a task to do certain jumps, but from 2008, the winner is selected according to the artistic impression of a whole group.

Publications
Vladan Papić, Ivan Granić & Hrvoje Turić: Picigin kao vodeni sport: početno istraživanje, scientific paper published in Acta Kinesiologica

References

External links 

Picigin site
Bačvice, Split

Ball games
Water sports
Croatian games
Sport in Croatia
Split, Croatia